Filippiada is a small town and a former municipality in the Preveza regional unit, Epirus, Greece. Since the 2011 local government reform it is part of the municipality Ziros, of which it is a municipal unit. The municipal unit has an area of 142.409 km2. It has a population of 8,106 (2011 census).

Geography 
The town of Filippiada is situated at the foot of low hills on the right bank of the river Louros. The northern part of the municipal unit is mountainous. The Greek National Road 5 (Antirrio - Agrinio - Arta - Ioannina) passes through the town, and the Greek National Road 21 connects it with Preveza.

History 
The area of Filippiada has been inhabited since at least the 8th and 7th centuries BC. The ancient cities of Charadron (Χάραδρον) and Bouchetion (on which the medieval Byzantine castle of Rogoi was built) were located here. There are many sites such as Saint Bessarion Church, the monument in honor of the fighters of the Battle of Bizani, and Lake Ziros.

Subdivisions 
The municipal unit Filippiada is subdivided into the following communities (constituent villages in brackets):
 Agios Georgios
 Dryofyto
 Filippiada 
 Gymnotopos
 Kerasona (Kerasona, Agia Faneromeni)
 Kleisoura (Kleisoura, Pente Pigadia)
 Nea Kerasounta (Nea Kerasounta, Iliovouni)
 Panagia (Panagia, Gonia, Voulista)
 Petra
 Romia (Romia, Paidopoli Zirou)

Population

See also
 List of settlements in the Preveza regional unit

References 

Populated places in Preveza (regional unit)